Conference Carolinas, formerly known as the Carolinas-Virginia Athletic Conference (CVAC) or the Carolinas Conference, is a college athletic conference affiliated with the National Collegiate Athletic Association (NCAA) primarily at the Division II level. It is also considered as one of the seven Division I conferences for men's volleyball. Originally formed in 1930, the league reached its modern incarnation in 1994. Member institutions are located in the southeastern United States in the states of Georgia, North Carolina, South Carolina, and Tennessee. The Conference Carolinas membership currently consists of 13 small colleges or universities, 11 private and two public.

History

Conference Carolinas dates to its inception on December 6, 1930. The conference was formed then as an athletic association "for the greater advantage of the small colleges in North Carolina". The official name given back then was the North State Intercollegiate Conference but known informally as the Old North State Conference. The birthplace was the Washington Duke Hotel in Durham, North Carolina, and the seven charter members were Appalachian, Atlantic Christian (now Barton College), Catawba, Guilford, Elon, High Point, and Lenoir–Rhyne.

The conference followed a policy of expansion for a period of time. Western Carolina became a member in 1933, East Carolina in 1947, Pfeiffer in 1960, Newberry in 1961, and Presbyterian in 1964, followed closely by Mars Hill.

With the acceptance of the first member from South Carolina in Newberry College, a name change became necessary. Thus on May 20, 1961 the official name of the conference was changed to the Carolinas Intercollegiate Athletic Conference (CIAC) but commonly known less formerly as the Carolinas Conference.

East Carolina resigned in 1962 to join the Southern Conference and Appalachian and Western Carolina followed. Football sponsorship in the Carolinas Conference was dropped in 1973 when Lenoir–Rhyne, Newberry, Presbyterian, and Mars Hill joined the South Atlantic Conference.

Pembroke State University, now the University of North Carolina at Pembroke, became a first-time member in 1976 followed by Wingate College in 1979, and Lenoir–Rhyne re-joined in 1984.

While Guilford College withdrew in 1988, St. Andrews and Mount Olive were added that same year.

The 1989–90 academic year started a new era as Catawba, Elon, Lenoir–Rhyne and Wingate all withdrew to compete in the first year that the South Atlantic Conference provided championships in all sports, not just football.

The Carolinas Conference then added Belmont Abbey in 1989, Coker College (now Coker University) in 1991, and Lees-McRae in 1993. Pembroke State left in 1992.

The 1993–94 academic year brought a change to the conference national affiliation. The conference began the process of transferring membership to the National Collegiate Athletic Association (NCAA) after years as a National Association of Intercollegiate Athletics (NAIA) member. During the transition, it was a dual member of the NCAA's Division II and the NAIA's Division I.

The 1995–96 year brought dramatic change to the conference. First, full membership into NCAA Division II was acquired and NAIA affiliation dropped. Thus, this was the first official year of full competition and championship play for the conference in NCAA D-II status. Secondly, this was also the same year that Erskine, Longwood, and Queens were accepted as full members of the conference. With Longwood becoming the first Virginia member, another name change occurred and the Carolinas-Virginia Athletics Conference (known more universally as the 'CVAC') was born.

Following the 1997 academic year High Point resigned to join the NCAA D-I ranks while in 1998 Limestone soon joined and were quickly followed by Anderson in 1999.

In 2003, Longwood University left the conference to explore possibilities in NCAA Division I. Then in 2005 the CVAC added Converse College (becoming Converse University in July 2021) as an affiliate member before becoming a full member starting  in the 2007–08 season.

With the lone Virginia school in Longwood leaving, the league decided to go back to its roots and change its name to Conference Carolinas June 1, 2007.

On June 1, 2011, King College and North Greenville University became official members of the conference and opened the conference to its first Tennessee member in King.

In 2013–14, Emmanuel College (Georgia) and Southern Wesleyan University became official members of the conference and opened the conference to its first Georgia member in Emmanuel. Southern Wesleyan began official full NCAA D-II membership in 2016–17 while Emmanuel started in 2018–19.

After 57 years as a league member Pfeiffer University moved down to the NCAA D-III ranks on June 1, 2017.

Conference Carolinas and the South Atlantic Conference entered into a partnership  in the 2018–19 school year by which the two leagues would operate as a single conference in field hockey and wrestling, with championships immediately conducted in both sports. The leagues agreed that CC would coordinate the wrestling championship, while the SAC would fill the same role for field hockey. Accordingly, all CC field hockey programs became de facto affiliates of the SAC, while SAC wrestling programs became de facto CC affiliates. The CC–SAC alliance is officially branded as "South Atlantic Conference Carolinas".

After the completion of the 2018–19 athletic year, former Commissioner Alan Patterson retired and was replaced by Chris Colvin.  One of the first moves made by Colvin was to move the league headquarters to Greenville, South Carolina to be more centrally located to all member institutions.

The league now has 13 members, with the most recent changes taking place in 2021. Francis Marion University joined for the first time, and the University of North Carolina at Pembroke returned after an absence of nearly 30 years. They were the first public schools to join CC since Longwood's 2003 departure. The most recent departure from CC was that of Limestone College (now Limestone University), which moved to the SAC in 2020.

Many institutions have been members of the league during its rich history including Anderson, Appalachian, Barton (formerly Atlantic Christian), Belmont Abbey, Catawba, Coker, Converse, East Carolina, Erskine, Emmanuel, Francis Marion, Guilford, Elon, High Point, King, Lees-McRae, Lenoir–Rhyne, Limestone, Longwood, Mars Hill, Mount Olive, Newberry, North Greenville, Pfeiffer, Presbyterian, Queens, St. Andrews, UNC Pembroke (both as Pembroke State and under its current name), Western Carolina and Wingate.

Barton is the only remaining charter member followed in longevity by Mount Olive's joining in 1988.

For the 2020–21 school year, CC added acrobatics and tumbling, newly added to the NCAA Emerging Sports for Women program in that same school year, as its newest sport. Initially, five full members and one associate were to start competition, but two more associates were added before competition began.

The arrival of Francis Marion and return of UNC Pembroke were not the only changes to the conference membership in 2021. Converse admitted men to its residential undergraduate program for the first time, and also added men's sports. Converse initially planned to field seven teams, but did not field the initially announced men's volleyball team. Also in 2021–22, current SAC member Lincoln Memorial University added men's wrestling; Emory & Henry College, which sponsors that sport, started a transition from Division III to Division II, joining the SAC (although it did not start full SAC competition until 2022–23); and Mars Hill University became an associate member in acrobatics & tumbling. Emory & Henry and Lincoln Memorial became de facto CC affiliates as part of South Atlantic Conference Carolinas.

Also for the 2021–22 season, CC announced a partnership with the Great Midwest Athletic Conference to conduct joint men's and women's bowling championship events (even though men's bowling is not considered a varsity sport by the NCAA). Each conference organizes its regular season independently, but the postseason is called Conference Carolinas/Great Midwest Athletic Conference Men's and Women's Bowling Championships. CC also announced Lincoln Memorial and Tusculum as new affiliate members for bowling.

In December 2021, CC and the SAC jointly announced that they would extend their existing partnership to include two women's sports, triathlon and wrestling, with triathlon competition starting in 2022–23 and wrestling in 2023–24. At the same time, both conferences agreed that after the 2021–22 school year, the SAC would become the only one of the two conferences to sponsor field hockey. The joint men's wrestling league will continue to operate through the 2022–23 season, after which both conferences will establish their own men's wrestling leagues.

On June 24, 2022, CC added Wingate as an acrobatics and tumbling affiliate starting with that program's first season in 2023–24.

On January 26, 2023, CC announced the addition of Shorter University as its 15th member for 2024–25 school year. The addition of Shorter gave the Conference Carolinas its sixth football sponsoring institution, and accordingly that same day, it was also announced that the Conference Carolinas would begin sponsoring football in 2025. Sponsoring members would include Shorter and North Greenville, whose programs played in the Gulf South Conference, Barton and Erskine, affiliates of the South Atlantic Conference, UNC Pembroke, affiliate of the Mountain East Conference, and Chowan, up until 2022 was an affiliate of the Central Intercollegiate Athletics Association. It was also announced that Chowan will begin affiliation with the Gulf South Conference for the 2023 and 2024 seasons and that Shorter will compete as a D-II football independent for the 2024 season, with Erskine switching affiliations from the SAC to the GSC that season only to take their place, in order to accommodate programs until league play can begin.

Chronological timeline
 1930 – The Conference Carolinas was founded as the North State Intercollegiate Athletic Conference (NSIAC). Charter members included Appalachian State Teachers College (now Appalachian State University), Atlantic Christian College (now Barton College), Catawba College, Elon College (now Elon University), Guilford College, High Point College (now High Point University) and Lenoir–Rhyne College (now Lenoir–Rhyne University) beginning the 1930–31 academic year.
 1933 – Western Carolina Teachers College (now Western Carolina University) joined the NSIAC in the 1933–34 academic year.
 1947 – East Carolina Teachers College (now East Carolina University) joined the NSIAC in the 1947–48 academic year.
 1961 – The NSIAC has been rebranded as the Carolinas Intercollegiate Athletic Conference (CIAC) in the 1961–62 academic year.
 1961 – Pfeiffer College (now Pfeiffer University) and Newberry College joined the CIAC in the 1961–62 academic year.
 1962 – East Carolina left the CIAC to join the Division I ranks of the National Collegiate Athletic Association (NCAA) as an NCAA D-I Independent after the 1961–62 academic year.
 1965 – Presbyterian College joined the CIAC in the 1965–66 academic year.
 1968 – Appalachian State left the CIAC to join the NCAA Division I ranks as an NCAA D-I Independent after the 1961–62 academic year.
 1969 – Western Carolina left the CIAC to join the NCAA Division I ranks as an NCAA D-I Independent after the 1961–62 academic year.
 1972 – Newberry and Presbyterian left the CIAC to become NAIA Independents after the 1971–72 academic year.
 1972 – Mars Hill College (now Mars Hill University) joined the CIAC in the 1972–73 academic year.
 1975 – Lenoir–Rhyne left the CIAC to become an NAIA Independent after the 1974–75 academic year.
 1976 – Mars Hill left the CIAC to become an NAIA Independent after the 1975–76 academic year.
 1976 – Pembroke State University (now the University of North Carolina at Pembroke) joined the CIAC in the 1976–77 academic year.
 1979 – Wingate College (now Wingate University) joined the CIAC in the 1979–80 academic year.
 1984 – Lenoir–Rhyne re-joined the CIAC in the 1984–85 academic year.
 1988 – Guilford left the CIAC to join the NCAA Division III ranks and the Old Dominion Athletic Conference (ODAC) after the 1987–88 academic year.
 1988 – Mount Olive College (now the University of Mount Olive) and St. Andrews Presbyterian College (now St. Andrews University) joined the CIAC in the 1988–89 academic year.
 1989 – Catawba, Elon, Lenoir–Rhyne and Wingate left the CIAC to form part of the South Atlantic Conference (SAC) after the 1988–89 academic year.
 1989 – Belmont Abbey College joined the CIAC in the 1989–90 academic year.
 1991 – Coker College (now Coker University) joined the CIAC in the 1991–92 academic year.
 1992 – Pembroke State (now UNC Pembroke) left the CIAC to join the Peach Belt Conference (PBC) after the 1991–92 academic year.
 1993 – The CIAC was granted affiliate membership status within the National Collegiate Athletic Association (NCAA), while still having membership within the National Association of Intercollegiate Athletics (NAIA) in the 1993–94 academic year.
 1993 – Lees–McRae College joined the CIAC in the 1993–94 academic year.
 1995 – The CIAC had achieved full membership status within the NCAA Division II ranks in the 1995–96 academic year.
 1995 – The CIAC has been rebranded as the Carolinas–Virginia Athletic Conference (CVAC) in the 1995–96 academic year.
 1995 – Erskine College, Longwood College (now Longwood University) and Queens College of Charlotte (now Queens University of Charlotte) joined the CVAC in the 1995–96 academic year.
 1997 – High Point left the CVAC to join the NCAA Division II ranks as an NCAA D-II Independent (who would later join the NCAA Division I ranks and the Big South Conference beginning the 1999–2000 academic year) after the 1996–97 academic year.
 1998 – Limestone College (now Limestone University) and Anderson College of South Carolina (now Anderson University of South Carolina) joined the CVAC in the 1998–99 academic year.
 2003 – Longwood left the CVAC to join the NCAA Division II ranks as an NCAA D-II Independent after the 2002–03 academic year.
 2005 – Converse College (now Converse University) joined the CVAC as an affiliate member for women’s cross country, soccer, tennis and volleyball in the 2005–06 academic year.
 2007 – The CVAC has been rebranded as the Conference Carolinas (CC) in the 2007–08 academic year.
 2007 – Converse had upgraded to join the CVAC (now CC) for all sports in the 2007–08 academic year.
 2010 – Anderson (S.C.) left the CC to join the SAC after the 2009–10 academic year.
 2011 – King College of Tennessee (now King University) and North Greenville University joined the CC in the 2011–12 academic year.
 2012 – St. Andrews left the CC to join the Appalachian Athletic Conference (AAC) of the National Association of Intercollegiate Athletics (NAIA) after the 2011–12 academic year.
 2013 – Coker and Queens (N.C.) left the CC to join the SAC after the 2013–14 academic year.
 2014 – Emmanuel College and Southern Wesleyan University joined the CC as provisional members in the 2014–15 academic year.
 2016 – Southern Wesleyan began full member competition in NCAA Division II and the CC in the 2016–17 academic year.
 2016 – Chowan University joined the CC as an affiliate member for women's golf, men's soccer, women's soccer, men's lacrosse, and women's lacrosse in the 2016–17 academic year.
 2017 – Pfeiffer left the CC to join the NCAA Division III ranks and the USA South Athletic Conference after the 2016–17 academic year.
 2018 – Emmanuel (Ga.) began full member competition in NCAA Division II and the CC in the 2018–19 academic year.
 2018 – Coker, Newberry and Queens (N.C.) re-joined the CC as affiliate members for field hockey and men's wrestling in the 2018–19 academic year.
 2019 – Chowan had upgraded to join the CC for all sports in the 2019–20 academic year.
 2020
 Limestone left the CC to join the SAC after the 2019–20 academic year; while it would remain in the conference as an affiliate member for acrobatics and tumbling and men's wrestling in the 2020–21 academic year.
 Lander University joined the CC as an affiliate member for acrobatics and tumbling in the 2020–21 academic year.
 2021
 CC added what it calls "Developmental Championships" for its members in 2021–22. The conference claims to be the first in the NCAA to sponsor sub-varsity championships. According to CC, developmental teams consist of individuals who competed either sparingly or not at all at the varsity level in the season of the championship. The first such championships were held in baseball, men's basketball, and men's & women's soccer.
 Francis Marion University joined and UNC Pembroke (formerly Pembroke State) rejoined CC in the 2021–22 academic year.
 Converse added men's sports into its athletic program, also effective with the 2021–22 academic year.
 Four institutions joined CC as affiliate members (Emory and Henry College for men's wrestling, Lincoln Memorial University for men's wrestling and men's & women's bowling, Mars Hill rejoined for acrobatics and tumbling, and Tusculum University for men's & women's bowling), all effective  in the 2021–22 academic year.
 2022
 Queens started a transition to Division I as a new member of the ASUN Conference, thus departing from its affiliate memberships in field hockey and men's wrestling.
 Women's basketball was added to the CC developmental championships roster for 2022–23.
 Young Harris College announces it will join CC in the 2023–24 academic year.

Member schools

Current members
The CC currently has 13 full members; all but the two newest members (Francis Marion and UNC Pembroke) are private schools.

Notes

Future members

Affiliate members
The CC currently has ten affiliate members, with all but one being private schools. Future affiliates highlighted in green, and departing affiliates highlighted in pink.

Notes

Former members
A total of 19 schools are former CC members, with 15 of them being private schools. School names and nicknames reflect those in use during the final year each institution was a member.

Notes

Former affiliate members
The CC had one former affiliate member.

Notes

Membership timeline

Sports
When Barton became the sixth member to sponsor men's volleyball in 2011–12, Conference Carolinas became the fourth official scholarship-granting conference in NCAA men's volleyball. It also became the first all-sports conference (i.e., one that sponsors men's and women's basketball) ever to sponsor men's volleyball as a scholarship sport, and is also the first men's volleyball conference to consist solely of Division II members. No D-I all-sports conference sponsored the sport until the Big West Conference launched a men's volleyball league  in the 2018 season (2017–18 school year).

Conference Carolinas sponsors intercollegiate athletic competition in the following sports:

In men's wrestling and women's triathlon, Conference Carolinas and the South Atlantic Conference operate as a single league known as South Atlantic Conference Carolinas (SACC), holding joint conference tournaments in each sport. SACC will also start sponsoring women's wrestling in 2023–24. SACC also operated in field hockey until the two conferences agreed that only the SAC would sponsor that sport starting in 2022–23. As noted previously, the men's wrestling championship is operated by CC through 2022–23, after which the SAC will establish its own men's wrestling league.

In bowling, Conferences Carolinas and the Great Midwest Athletic Conference made a partnership to make a men's and women's bowling championship (even though men's bowling is not considered a varsity sport by the NCAA). Each conference will organize its regular season independently but the postseason will be called Conference Carolinas/Great Midwest Athletic Conference Men's and Women's Bowling Championships.

Men's sponsored sports by school

Women's sponsored sports by school

Other sponsored sports by school

In addition to the above:
 Belmont Abbey fields varsity teams in the non-NCAA sports of cycling (coeducational with men's and women's squads), men's bowling, and men's triathlon. It also considers its band, cheerleaders (male and female), and dance team (all-female) to be varsity athletes.
 Chowan fields a coeducational esports team, and also considers its cheerleaders (male and female) to be varsity athletes.
 Converse fields a coeducational esports team, and its equestrian program is also coeducational, although only women compete in NCAA-recognized events.
 Emmanuel fields teams in four non-NCAA sports. Three teams are coeducational: archery (with men's and women's squads), bass fishing, and clay target shooting. The fourth is in men's bowling. It also considers its cheerleaders (male and female) to be varsity athletes.
 Erskine fields a coeducational esports team, plus coeducational teams in the non-NCAA sports of bass fishing and rodeo (with men-only and women-only disciplines).
 King fields a coeducational esports team, plus coeducational teams in the non-NCAA sports of cycling (men's and women's squads) and bass fishing. It also considers its cheerleaders (male and female) and dance team (all-female, though listed on its athletics website as coeducational) to be varsity athletes.
 Lees–McRae fields a varsity team in the non-NCAA sport of cycling (coeducational with men's and women's squads). It also considers its cheerleaders (male and female) to be varsity athletes. Unlike other CC members that field esports teams, Lees–McRae treats its esports program as a club sport.

See also

NCAA Men's National Collegiate Volleyball Championship, in which the CC champion receives an automatic berth

References

External links